Tauade is a Papuan language of Kira Rural LLG in Central Province, Papua New Guinea.

External links 
 Paradisec has the Tom Dutton collection (TD1) that includes Tauade language materials.

References

Languages of Central Province (Papua New Guinea)
Goilalan languages